A gulp refers to the act of swallowing.

Gulp may also refer to:

 Grenada United Labour Party
 Rai Gulp, an Italian children's television channel
 Gulp (film), British animated short film
 Gulp (Iraq), a city in Kurdistan and scene of several battles in Operation Viking Hammer
 Gulp (river), in eastern Belgium and southeastern Netherlands
 The "Big Gulp", a soft drink sold at 7-Eleven
 Gulp: Adventures on the Alimentary Canal, a book by Mary Roach
 Gulp (band), a Wales-based band formed by Guto Pryce and Lindsey Leven
 gulp.js, a JavaScript automation tool
 Gulp!, a 2022 album by English band Sports Team